Kilian Fischer (born 12 October 2000) is a German professional footballer who plays as a left-back or defensive midfielder for  club VfL Wolfsburg.

Career
Fischer joined Türkgücü München in July 2019 before extending his contract with the club the following summer.

On 10 June 2022, Fischer signed a five-year contract with VfL Wolfsburg.

References

External links
 Profile at the VfL Wolfsburg website
 

2000 births
Living people
People from Miltenberg
Sportspeople from Lower Franconia
Footballers from Bavaria
Germany under-21 international footballers
German footballers
Association football midfielders
Association football fullbacks
TSV 1860 Munich II players
Türkgücü München players
1. FC Nürnberg players
VfL Wolfsburg players
Oberliga (football) players
Regionalliga players
3. Liga players
2. Bundesliga players